De Grisogono is a Swiss luxury jeweller founded in Geneva, Switzerland, in 1993 by Lebanese-Italian black diamond specialist Fawaz Gruosi. The Italian name Grisogono is derived from the Latin Chrysogonus which comes from the Greek Chrysogonos χρῡσό-γονος, meaning "begotten of gold". The company filed for bankruptcy on 29 January 2020. In 2022 it was bought by the Damac Group of Dubai.

Overview 
In 2012, Gruosi had to give-up majority ownership in De Grisogono. The majority was taken-over by investors centered around Isabel dos Santos, the richest woman in Africa and daughter of Angolan dictator and kleptocrat, José Eduardo dos Santos. Dos Santos had quietly routed millions of dollars through shell companies in Malta and the British Virgin Islands.

In 2017, De Grisogono entered into a new partnership with former Leviev executives David and Lisa Klein.

"Creation I," a necklace by de Grisogono, was sold for nearly Dh125 million, in 2017's Christie's sale.

In 2017, the company set a new record at Christie's Magnificent Jewels sale in Geneva when it sold the world's biggest-ever emerald cut diamond offered at auction. The 163.41-carat D Flawless stone, which was cut from a 404 carat rough, was incorporated into a necklace designed by Fawaz Gruosi. It fetched 33.5 million Swiss francs, beating the previous record for a D Flawless diamond by nearly five million Swiss francs.

In 2010, Isabel dos Santos, set up a Victoria Holdings in Malta and funneled Angola's diamonds through De Grisogono out of the country. In January 2020 De Grisogono was named in the "Luanda Leaks" investigation by the International Consortium of Investigative Journalists as being part of the business empire of Angola's Isabel dos Santos. On 29 January 2020, de Grisogono filed for bankruptcy.  In 2022 it was bought by the Damac Group of Dubai.

See also
 List of watch manufacturers
 Spirit of de Grisogono Diamond

References

Luxury brands
Manufacturing companies based in Geneva
Watch manufacturing companies of Switzerland
Swiss jewelry designers
Watch brands
Manufacturing companies established in 1993